Svetilovo is a rural locality (a village) in Domshinskoye Rural Settlement, Sheksninsky District, Vologda Oblast, Russia. The population was 92 as of 2002.

Geography 
Svetilovo is located 43 km east of Sheksna (the district's administrative centre) by road. Papushino is the nearest rural locality.

References 

Rural localities in Sheksninsky District